Richard Arthur Warren Hughes  (19 April 1900 – 28 April 1976) was a British writer of poems, short stories, novels and plays.

He was born in Weybridge, Surrey.  His father was Arthur Hughes, a civil servant, and his mother Louisa Grace Warren who had been brought up in the West Indies in Jamaica.  He was educated first at Charterhouse School and graduated from Oriel College, Oxford in 1922.

A Charterhouse schoolmaster had sent Hughes's first published work to the magazine The Spectator in 1917. The article, written as a school essay, was an unfavourable criticism of The Loom of Youth, by Alec Waugh, a recently published novel which caused a furore for its account of homosexual passions between British schoolboys in a public school. At Oxford he met Robert Graves, also an Old Carthusian, and they co-edited a poetry publication, Oxford Poetry, in 1921. Hughes's short play The Sisters' Tragedy was being staged in the West End of London at the Royal Court Theatre by 1922. He was the author of the world's first radio play, A Comedy Of Danger, commissioned from him for the BBC by Nigel Playfair and broadcast on 15 January 1924.

Hughes was employed as a journalist and travelled widely before he married the painter Frances Bazley (1905–1985) in 1932. They settled for a period in Norfolk and then in 1934 at Castle House, Laugharne in South Wales. Dylan Thomas stayed with Hughes and wrote his book Portrait of the Artist as a Young Dog whilst living at Castle House. Hughes was instrumental in Thomas relocating permanently to the area.

He wrote only four novels, the most famous of which is The Innocent Voyage (1929), or A High Wind in Jamaica, as Hughes renamed it soon after its initial publication. Set in the 19th century, it explores the events which follow the accidental capture of a group of English children by pirates: the children are revealed as considerably more amoral than the pirates (it was in this novel that Hughes first described the cocktail Hangman's Blood). In 1938, he wrote an allegorical novel, In Hazard, based on the true story of the S.S. Phemius that was caught in the 1932 Cuba hurricane for four days during its maximum intensity. He wrote volumes of children's stories, including The Spider's Palace.

During the war, Hughes had a desk job in the Admiralty. He met the architects Jane Drew and Maxwell Fry, whose children stayed with the Hughes family for much of that time. After the end of the war, he spent ten years writing scripts for Ealing Studios, and published no more novels until 1961. Of the trilogy The Human Predicament, only the first two volumes, The Fox in the Attic (1961) and The Wooden Shepherdess (1973), were complete when he died; twelve chapters, less than 50 pages, of the final volume are now published. In these he describes the course of European history from the 1920s through World War II, including real characters and events—such as Hitler's escape after the abortive Munich putsch—as well as fictional.

Later in life Hughes relocated to Ynys in Gwynedd.
He was churchwarden of Llanfihangel-y-traethau, the village church, where he was buried when he died at home in 1976.

Hughes was a Fellow of the Royal Society of Literature and, in the United States, an honorary member of both the National Institute of Arts and Letters and the American Academy of Arts and Letters. He was awarded the OBE (Officer of the Order of the British Empire) in 1946.

Family

Richard and Frances Hughes had five children.

References

External links
 Hughes manuscripts collected at Indiana University
 
 
 

1900 births
1976 deaths
English short story writers
Welsh poets
Welsh novelists
Welsh short story writers
Welsh dramatists and playwrights
Alumni of Oriel College, Oxford
Officers of the Order of the British Empire
Fellows of the Royal Society of Literature
People educated at Charterhouse School
People from Weybridge
British radio writers
20th-century English novelists
20th-century English poets
20th-century English dramatists and playwrights
British male poets
British male dramatists and playwrights
English male short story writers
English male novelists
20th-century British short story writers
20th-century English male writers